Arthur Julien Tremblay,  (June 18, 1917 – October 27, 1996) was a Canadian politician.

Born in St-Bruno, Lac Saint-Jean, Quebec, he received a Master of Arts degree in 1942 from Université Laval and a Master of Education degree in 1945 from Harvard University.

In 1979, he was appointed by Joe Clark to the Senate representing the senatorial division of The Laurentides, Quebec. A Progressive Conservative, he retired on his 75th birthday in 1992.

In 1976, he was made an Officer of the Order of Canada for "his contribution to the public service". In 1991, he was made an Officer of the National Order of Quebec.

References

External links
 
 National Order of Quebec citation  

1917 births
1996 deaths
Canadian senators from Quebec
Officers of the National Order of Quebec
Officers of the Order of Canada
Members of the King's Privy Council for Canada
Progressive Conservative Party of Canada senators
Université Laval alumni
Harvard Graduate School of Education alumni
Academic staff of Université Laval